This article concerns the period 239 BC – 230 BC.

References